In biology, the BBCH-scale for beans describes the phenological development of bean plants using the BBCH-scale.

The phenological growth stages and BBCH-identification keys of bean are:

1 For varieties with limited flowering period
2 For varieties in which the flowering period is not limited

References

 

BBCH-scale